The Woodward Commission may refer to:

Aboriginal Land Rights Commission, chaired by Edward Woodward
Royal Commission into Drug Trafficking, chaired by Philip Woodward

See also
John Woodward (lawyer), chairman of the NSW Office of The Commissioners of Inquiry for Environment and Planning